The Cornwall Area of Outstanding Natural Beauty covers  in Cornwall, England, UK; that is, about 27% of the total area of the county.  It comprises 12 separate areas, designated under the National Parks and Access to the Countryside Act 1949 for special landscape protection.  Of the areas, eleven cover stretches of coastline; the twelfth is Bodmin Moor.  The areas are together treated as a single Area of Outstanding Natural Beauty (AONB).

Section 85 of the Countryside and Rights of Way Act 2000 places a duty on all relevant authorities when discharging any function affecting land within an AONB to have regard to the purpose of conserving and enhancing natural beauty. Section 89 places a statutory duty on Local Planning Authorities with an AONB within their administrative area to produce a 5-year management plan.

Designation
The areas were designated in 1959, except for the Camel estuary which was added in 1981.   The list of designated areas is:
 Hartland (Morwenstow and Kilkhampton)
 Pentire Point to Widemouth
 Camel Estuary
 Trevose Head to Stepper Point (Bedruthan to Padstow)
 St Agnes
 Godrevy to Portreath
 West Penwith
 South Coast - Western (Lizard and Marazion to Helford River)
 South Coast - Central (Mylor & the Roseland to Porthpean)
 South Coast - Eastern (Par Sands to Looe)
 Rame Head
 Bodmin Moor
There are separate AONBs covering the Tamar Valley (which is partly in Cornwall and partly in Devon - the east bank of the river Tamar forms the boundary between Cornwall/Kernow and Devon), and the Isles of Scilly - which is administered for most purposes separately to Cornwall.

Management
The Cornwall AONB is managed by a Partnership of 21 organisations
Cornwall Agri-food Council
Cornwall Association of Local Councils
Cornwall Council 
Cornwall Heritage Trust
Cornwall Rural Community Charity
Cornwall Sustainable Tourism Project (CoaST)
Cornwall Wildlife Trust
Country Land and Business Association
ERCCIS (Environmental Records Centre for Cornwall & the Isles of Scilly)
Historic England
Farming & Wildlife Advisory Group (FWAG)
King Harry Ferry
National Farmers Union
National Trust 
Natural England
Rural Cornwall & Isles of Scilly Partnership (RCP)
University of Exeter in Cornwall
VisitCornwall
Volunteer Cornwall
Westcountry Rivers Trust

The Partnership meets twice a year to identify the prioritisation of action and the implementation of the Plan. The Partnership also has an advisory role, providing advice to Cornwall Council and other organisations on matters such as planning and project development. The Partnership is supported by a team of officers – the Cornwall AONB Unit who exist to administer the Partnership, undertake delivery, access resources, influence, enable and support Partner organisations in the delivery of the Management Plan.

The first Cornwall AONB Management Plan was adopted by the members of the Cornwall AONB Partnership in July 2004. The latest Cornwall AONB Management Plan, 2022-27, was adopted by Cornwall Council and the members of the Cornwall AONB Partnership in May 2022.

References

Areas of Outstanding Natural Beauty in England
Geography of Cornwall
Protected areas established in 1959
Protected areas of Cornwall
Cornish coast